Galtara doriae is a moth of the subfamily Arctiinae. It was described by Charles Oberthür in 1880. It is found in the Democratic Republic of the Congo, Ethiopia, Kenya, Malawi, Rwanda, South Africa, Tanzania and Uganda.

Subspecies
Galtara doriae doriae
Galtara doriae megadoriae Toulgoët, 1977 (Ethiopia)

References

 

Nyctemerina
Moths described in 1880